Nils Andreas Nygaard (3 April 1932 –  3 November 2015) was a Norwegian professor of law.

He was born in Imsland. He took the dr.juris degree in 1974 on the thesis Aktløysevurderinga i norsk rettspraksis and was hired as a professor of jurisprudence at the University of Bergen in 1977. He has many notable publications.

References

1932 births
2015 deaths
Norwegian legal scholars
Academic staff of the University of Bergen
People from Rogaland